Arnold Kieffer (30 September 1910 – 28 June 1991) was a Luxembourgian footballer. He competed in the men's tournament at the 1936 Summer Olympics.

References

External links
 
 

1910 births
1991 deaths
Luxembourgian footballers
Luxembourg international footballers
Olympic footballers of Luxembourg
Footballers at the 1936 Summer Olympics
People from Differdange
Association football defenders
CS Pétange players
FC Progrès Niederkorn players